Dramatic School may refer to:

 Dramatic School (film), a 1938 American romantic drama film
 Drama school